El Oasis is a rural community in Ojinaga Municipality, Chihuahua, Mexico. It had a population of 475 inhabitants at the 2010 census, and is situated at an elevation of 1,204 meters above sea level.

References

Populated places in Chihuahua (state)